Valentyna Radzymovska (born October 1, 1886 – December 22, 1953) was a Ukrainian researcher in the fields of biochemistry and physiology, public activist of Ukrainian national movement.

Early life and career 
Valentyna was born in Lubny into a family of Ukrainian writers. Her mother was Lyubov Yanovska.

She studied in Kyiv Higher Women Medical Courses, as women were not allowed to study in the University those days. Still, she was prohibited from studying medicine as she took part in illegal political activity supporting Ukrainian national renaissance. So in 1904, she should leave for Kyiv where she actually was graduated from the University in 1913. Radzymovska joined physiological chemistry chair staff under Oleksii Sadoven. 

In 1924, she defended her doctoral thesis and became professor of biochemistry and physiology in Medical Institute and People's Educational Institute in Kyiv.

Later in 1930 she was arrested by Soviet State Political Directorate on political accusations in Union for the Freedom of Ukraine trial. Later, she was released from custody, but still fired from her research positions. Radzymovska recovered some of them in mid 1930s. In 1939-1941 she was physiology professor in Melitopol Educational Institute. 

In 1941, she stayed in Ukraine during German invasion and occupation. She holds positions in Kyiv Clinical Medicine Institute and Chair in Lviv University. In 1943, she left to Germany and in 1950 to the United States.

Death 
She died in Illinois on December 22, 1953.

Family 
Her children were Olha and Yevhen Radzymovskyi. Yevhen was researcher in engineering (1905-1975), professor in University of Illinois at Urbana–Champaign since 1959.

Notable works

Sources 
 Ivan Rozhin. Valentina Radzimovsky: SHORT SKETCH OF HER LIFE, HER SCIENTIFIC AND PUBLIC ACTIVITY.; Published by the Ukrainian Free Academy of Sciences — Winnipeg, 1968. — 48 p.

Ukrainian physiologists
1886 births
1953 deaths